Mirpur Bathoro Tehsil is an administrative subdivision (tehsil) of Sujawal District. Previously it was in Thatta District in the Sindh province of Pakistan. Its capital is the city of Thatta.

Administration
Mirpur Bathoro Taluka is administratively subdivided into 8 Union Councils.

Mirpur Bathoro is a taluka in the Sujawal District, Sindh, Pakistan, located about 55  km southwest of Tando Muhammad Khan District and 50 km northeast of Thatta.

It has famous villages like Jhok Sharif. Famous for its Shrine of Soofi Shah Inayat Shaheed, who fought for the rights of peasants against feudal lords and the government.
Daro City the main business town of Mirpur Bathoro and has the highest literacy rate in the Sujawal District.
Bannu a small town situated on the Left Bank of the river Indus.
Mirpur Bathoro town is birthplace of great saint Makhdoom Muhammad Hashim Thattvi.

References

Talukas of Sindh
Populated places in Sujawal District